The H. & J. Pfaff Brewing Company was a brewery founded by brothers Henry and Jacob Pfaff in 1857, in Boston, Massachusetts, USA.

See also
 List of defunct consumer brands

References 

Beer brewing companies based in Massachusetts
Food and drink companies based in Boston
Manufacturing companies based in Boston
Defunct companies based in Massachusetts
American companies established in 1857
Food and drink companies established in 1857
1857 establishments in Massachusetts
Defunct consumer brands